South Carolina Highway 773 (SC 773) is a  state highway in the U.S. state of South Carolina. The highway connects rural areas of Newberry County with Pomaria.

Route description
SC 773 begins at an intersection with U.S. Route 76 (US 76) at a point east-northeast of Prosperity, Newberry County, where the roadway continues as a local road. This intersection is northwest of Mid-Carolina Middle School and Mid-Carolina High School. It travels to the northeast and crosses over various sets of railroad tracks. It travels along the western edge of the Mid Carolina Club golf course just before an interchange with Interstate 26 (I-26). SC 773 passes St. Paul's Cemetery before entering Pomaria. There, it meets its northern terminus, an intersection with US 176.

Major intersections

See also

References

External links

SC 773 at Virginia Highways' South Carolina Highways Annex

773
Transportation in Newberry County, South Carolina